House at 173 Sixteenth Avenue is a historic home located at Sea Cliff in Nassau County, New York.  It was built about 1880 and is a -story, cruciform clapboard residence with a cross-gable  roof.  It features a two-tiered wraparound porch and Gothic details.

It was listed on the National Register of Historic Places in 1988.

References

Houses on the National Register of Historic Places in New York (state)
Gothic Revival architecture in New York (state)
Houses completed in 1880
Houses in Nassau County, New York
National Register of Historic Places in Nassau County, New York